Richard Joseph "Dick" Desmond (March 2, 1927 – November 1, 1990) was an American ice hockey player who was a member of the American 1952 Winter Olympics ice hockey team. He was inducted into the United States Hockey Hall of Fame in 1988.

Awards and honors

References

External links
 
 United States Hockey Hall of Fame

1927 births
1990 deaths
American men's ice hockey goaltenders
Dartmouth Big Green men's ice hockey players
Ice hockey players from Massachusetts
Ice hockey players at the 1952 Winter Olympics
Medalists at the 1952 Winter Olympics
Olympic silver medalists for the United States in ice hockey
Sportspeople from Medford, Massachusetts
United States Hockey Hall of Fame inductees
AHCA Division I men's ice hockey All-Americans